Morris Smith may refer to:

Morris Smith of Magellan Fund
Morris H. Smith

See also
Maurice Smith (disambiguation)
Cristiane de Morais Smith (physicist)